Tito Rodrigues is a Suriname Olympic middle-distance runner. He represented his country in the men's 1500 meters at the 1984 Summer Olympics. His time was a 4:02.87 in the first heat.

References 

1965 births
Living people
Surinamese male middle-distance runners
Olympic athletes of Suriname
Athletes (track and field) at the 1984 Summer Olympics